is a Taiwan-born Japanese critic and political activist. She is also known by the name Alice King. Kin is the president of the Shibanaga International School-JET Japanese Language School, and served as national policy adviser to President of the Republic of China Chen Shui-bian from 2000 to 2005. Her husband was Eimei Shu and she has a daughter and a son. Her eldest daughter is Tokyo Broadcasting System Television business office manager Mana Shu.

For many years Kin has been involved in the Taiwan independence movement.

Bibliography

Solo author

Co-authored, edited, co-edited

Translations

Magazine articles

Filmography

See also
Shinzō Abe
Yoshinori Kobayashi
Shi Wen-long
Japanophile
Taiwanization

References

External links
 

Japanese critics
Taiwan independence activists
Taiwanese exiles
Naturalized citizens of Japan
Taiwanese emigrants to Japan
1934 births
Living people
Waseda University alumni
Japanese women activists
Taiwanese women activists
Senior Advisors to President Chen Shui-bian
20th-century Taiwanese women writers
21st-century Taiwanese women writers
21st-century Japanese women writers